Eupastranaia is a genus of moths of the family Crambidae.

Species
Eupastranaia fenestrata (Ménétries, 1863)
Eupastranaia lilacina (Pagenstecher, 1892)
Eupastranaia tumidifrons (Munroe, 1970)

References

Midilinae
Crambidae genera